Cooked wine may refer to:

 Mulled wine, which is red wine with spices, served hot
 Vin cuit from Provence, France
 Vin cuit from Switzerland, concentrated apple sauce
 Vino cotto from Central Italy
 Vincotto from Northern Italy